Law of the Badlands is a 1951 American western film starring Tim Holt. Although the cheapest Holt vehicle since the war years, it still recorded a loss of $20,000.

Plot
In 1890, Captain McVey of the Texas Rangers is dispatched by the United States Secret Service in Washington, D.C. to assist in breaking up a counterfeiting ring in the Texas Badlands. McVey orders two of his Rangers, Dave and sidekick, Chito Rafferty, to infiltrate the ring posing as criminals. Chito bids farewell to his girlfriend, Velvet.  En route, they steal gold from a gang that held up a stagecoach. Arriving in Badland, Texas, Dave and Chito enter Cash Carlton's bar and stop a man named Madigan from robbing Carlton. Durkin and Benson, two of the gang from the stagecoach robbery, enter the bar to wrest the gold from Dave and Chito. Carlton intervenes and offers Dave and Chito an opportunity to work for him in his counterfeiting ring. Carlton's engraver, Simms, who also owns a feed store, is suspicious of Dave and Chito who are strangers. Carlton pays Dave and Chito for their stolen gold in counterfeit money.

Leaving Carlton's ranch house, Dave and Chito see a man lurking in Carlton's barn. The man escapes after knocking Chito to the ground. In town, Dave and Chito recognize the blacksmith as the man in Carlton's barn. When confronted, the blacksmith says his name is Burt Conroy and he is a secret service agent working undercover. He apologizes for hitting Chito and briefs the two on the gang's counterfeiting activities. Dave and Chito return to Carlton's bar where they are dispatched by Carlton and the rest of the gang to raid a newspaper office for supplies. Conroy uses a carrier pigeon to reveal the raid to Captain McVey. McVey and his rangers intercept the gang and kill two of its members in the ensuing gunfight. The gang suspect Dave and Chito of being informants, but Carlton disagrees and believes someone else in town is acting undercover. Dave and Chito warn Conroy that Carlton suspects only a carrier pigeon could deliver a message fast enough to have thwarted the raid. As Conroy rides out of town, Carlton kills him.

Dave and Chito return to Carlton's barn where they see Simms hauling blank paper. They break into Simms' feed store where they discover counterfeit cash stored in grain sacks. However, Simms returns before Dave and Chito can find the printing plates. Chito returns to the bar where Velvet, who has been hired as a showgirl by Carlton, recognizes Chito and unwittingly reveals his true identity. A gunfight ensues as Dave and Chito escape. Dave and Chito evade the gang and double back to town. They return to Simms' store and draw Carlton and Simms there under the ruse of a fire, where Carlton reveals the location of the printing plates. The gang arrives and Carlton escapes. A gunfight ensues. Carlton attempts to persuade Velvet to force Dave and Chito to surrender, but Velvet sends a message from Dave via carrier pigeon to Captain McVey. McVey and his rangers arrive to arrest the gang just as Dave and Chito run out of ammunition. Velvet, miffed that Chito posed as a criminal, storms off. Chito says he is through with women, but then pursues another one walking down the street.

Cast
 Tim Holt as Dave
 Richard Martin as Chito Rafferty
 Joan Dixon as Velvet
 Leonard Penn as Cash Carlton
 Robert Livingston as Durkin
 Robert Bray as Benson
 Larry Johns as Lafe Simms
 Harry Woods as Burt Conroy
 John Cliff as Madigan
 Kenneth MacDonald as Captain McVey

References

External links

1951 films
1951 Western (genre) films
American Western (genre) films
RKO Pictures films
Films directed by Lesley Selander
American black-and-white films
1950s English-language films
1950s American films